Stenarctia abdominalis is a moth of the subfamily Arctiinae first described by Rothschild in 1910. It is found in Angola, Cameroon, Kenya, Sierra Leone and Uganda.

References

Moths described in 1910
Arctiini
Moths of Africa